Al Kooper (born Alan Peter Kuperschmidt; February 5, 1944) is a retired American songwriter, record producer and musician, known for organizing Blood, Sweat & Tears, although he did not stay with the group long enough to share its popularity. Throughout much of the 1960s and 1970s he was a prolific studio musician, playing organ on the Bob Dylan song "Like a Rolling Stone", French horn and piano on the Rolling Stones song "You Can't Always Get What You Want", and lead guitar on Rita Coolidge's "The Lady's Not for Sale", among many other appearances. Kooper also produced a number of one-off collaboration albums, such as the Super Session album that saw him work separately with guitarists Mike Bloomfield and Stephen Stills. In the 1970s Kooper was a successful manager and producer, recording Lynyrd Skynyrd's first three albums. He has also had a successful solo career, writing music for film soundtracks, and has lectured in musical composition.

Early life 
Al Kooper was born in Brooklyn, New York City, to Sam and Natalie Kuperschmidt (who were Jewish), and grew up in Hollis Hills, Queens, New York.

Career

Professional debut
Kooper's first professional work was as a 14-year-old guitarist in The Royal Teens, best known for their 1958 ABC Records novelty novelty song "Short Shorts" (although Kooper did not play on that recording). In 1960, he teamed up with songwriters Bob Brass and Irwin Levine to write and record demos for Sea-Lark Music Publishing. The trio's biggest hits were "This Diamond Ring", recorded by Gary Lewis and the Playboys, and "I Must Be Seeing Things", recorded by Gene Pitney (both 1965). When he was 21, Kooper moved to Greenwich Village in Manhattan.

With Bob Dylan
He first performed with Bob Dylan playing the Hammond organ riffs on "Like a Rolling Stone". He had been invited to watch the recording by producer Tom Wilson. It was in those recording sessions that Kooper met and befriended Mike Bloomfield, whose guitar playing he admired. He worked with Bloomfield for several years. In 1965, Kooper played with Dylan in concert, and played Hammond organ with Dylan at the Newport Folk Festival, as well as in the recording studio in 1965 and 1966. He played organ once again with Dylan during his 1981 world tour.

The Blues Project
Kooper joined The Blues Project as their keyboardist in 1965. He left the band shortly before their gig at the Monterey Pop Festival in 1967, although he did play a solo set, as evidenced by bootlegs of the event. He formed Blood, Sweat & Tears in 1967, leaving due to creative differences in 1968, after the release of the group's first album, Child Is Father to the Man. He recorded Super Session with Bloomfield and Stephen Stills in 1968, and in 1969 he collaborated with 15-year-old guitarist Shuggie Otis on the album Kooper Session. In 1972, he rejoined The Blues Project at a charity concert promoted by Bruce Blakeman at Valley Stream Central High School.

Other work

As musician
Kooper has played on hundreds of records, including ones by The Rolling Stones, B.B. King, The Who, The Jimi Hendrix Experience, Alice Cooper, and Cream. On occasion he overdubbed his own efforts, as on The Live Adventures of Mike Bloomfield and Al Kooper and other albums, under the pseudonym "Roosevelt Gook".

As record producer
In 1969, Kooper produced, arranged, and conducted the album Appaloosa, a "folk-baroque" style of music that combined rock and classical. Among other artists who were all arranging folk-oriented material with classical-influenced orchestration were Judy Collins, Donovan, Tim Hardin and Tom Rush. Kooper was joined by Boston musicians John Parker Compton, singer and acoustic guitarist, Robin Batteau on violin, Eugene Rosov on cello, and David Reiser on electric bass. Contributing to the album was saxophonist Fred Lipsius and Blood, Sweat and Tears drummer Bobby Colomby. After moving to Atlanta in 1972, he discovered the band Lynyrd Skynyrd, and produced and performed on their first three albums, including the singles "Sweet Home Alabama" and "Free Bird". In 1975 he produced the debut album of the Tubes.

TV scores
Kooper wrote the score for the TV series Crime Story and for the film The Landlord, as well as several made-for-television movies. He was the musical force behind many of the pop tunes, including "You're the Lovin' End", for The Banana Splits, a children's television program.

Studio
During the late 1980s, Kooper had his own dedicated keyboard studio room in the historic Sound Emporium recording studio in Nashville, next to studio B.

Rock Bottom Remainders
Kooper's status as a published author enabled him to join (and act as musical director of) the Rock Bottom Remainders, a band made up of writers including Dave Barry, Stephen King, Amy Tan, and Matt Groening.

New Music For Old People
Kooper wrote a column named "New Music For Old People" for online publication The Morton Report from April 2014 to April 2015. This later led to a radio show by the same name, which began in October 2018, for Martha's Vineyard community radio station WVVY. The first 11 editions of this can be found online.

Magazine writer
Kooper profiled Steve Martin for Crawdaddy Magazine in 1977.

Kooperkast

Kooper has his own podcast called "Kooperkast" which started in late 2020.   Hosted by webmaster Jon Sachs, Al discusses his various experiences in his more than 60 years in the music industry, including his solo albums, Bob Dylan, Lynyrd Skynyrd, and he answers your questions which can be submitted on the Kooperkast page on his website.

Honors, awards, and legacy

In May 2001, Kooper was awarded an Honorary Doctorate of Music from Berklee College of Music, in Boston. He taught songwriting and recording production at Berklee College of Music. He plays weekend concerts with his bands the ReKooperators and the Funky Faculty. In 2008, he participated in the production of the album Psalngs, the debut release of Canadian musician John Lefebvre.

Kooper was inducted into the Musicians Hall of Fame and Museum, in Nashville, in 2008.

In 2005, Martin Scorsese produced a documentary titled No Direction Home: Bob Dylan for the PBS American Masters Series, in which Kooper's contributions are recognized.

Memoir
Kooper published a memoir, Backstage Passes: Rock 'n' Roll Life in the Sixties (1977), which was revised and published as Backstage Passes and Backstabbing Bastards: Memoirs of a Rock 'n' Roll Survivor (1998). The revised edition includes indictments of "manipulators" in the music industry, including his one-time business manager, Stan Polley. An updated edition, including supplementary material, was published by Backbeat Books in 2008.

Discography

Solo

Studio albums
I Stand Alone (February 1969)
You Never Know Who Your Friends Are (October 1969)
Easy Does It (September 1970)
New York City (You're a Woman) (June 1971)
A Possible Projection of the Future / Childhood's End (April 1972)
Naked Songs (1973)
Act Like Nothing's Wrong (January 1977)
Championship Wrestling (featuring Jeff "Skunk" Baxter) (1982)
Rekooperation (June 1994)
Black Coffee (August 2005)
White Chocolate (2008)

Live albums
Soul of a Man (February 1995)

Soundtracks
The Landlord: Original Motion Picture Soundtrack (with the Staple Singers and Lorraine Ellison)

Compilation albums
Al's Big Deal - Unclaimed Freight (An Al Kooper Anthology) (1975)
 Rare and Well Done: The Greatest and Most Obscure Recordings 1964-2001 (2001)
 50/50 (50 Tracks/50 Years) (2008)

Collaborations
Super Session (with Stephen Stills and Mike Bloomfield) (1968)
The Live Adventures of Mike Bloomfield and Al Kooper (February 1969)
Fillmore East: The Lost Concert Tapes 12/13/68 (with Mike Bloomfield, recorded 1968, issued April 2003)
Kooper Session: Super Session Vol. 2 (with Shuggie Otis) (1969)
Johnnie B. Live (with Johnnie Johnson) (1997)

Other appearances

Sources
Mike Bloomfield, Me and Big Joe, Re/Search Publications, 1999, .
Jan Mark Wolkin and Bill Keenom, Michael Bloomfield -- If You Love These Blues: An Oral History,  Backbeat Books, 2000,  (with CD of unissued music).
 Ken Brooks, The Adventures of Mike Bloomfield and Al Kooper with Paul Butterfield and David Clayton Thomas, Agenda, 1999, .
Al Kooper, Backstage Passes: Rock 'n' Roll Life in the Sixties, Stein & Day, 1977, .
Al Kooper, Backstage Passes and Backstabbing Bastards: Memoirs of a Rock 'n' Roll Survivor (updated ed.), Billboard Books, 1998, .
Al Kooper, Backstage Passes and Backstabbing Bastards (new ed.), Hal Leonard, 2008, .
Ed Ward, Michael Bloomfield: The Rise and Fall of an American Guitar Hero, Cherry Lane Books,1983, .

Notes

References

External links

 Official Al Kooper website
 Al Kooper's Myspace page with Bio
 Extensive audio interview with Terry Gross on NPR's 'Fresh Air' program, January 3, 2004

1944 births
Living people
20th-century American keyboardists
American male organists
American session musicians
American rock singers
Songwriters from New York (state)
Berklee College of Music faculty
Jewish American musicians
Martin Van Buren High School alumni
Musicians from Brooklyn
Blood, Sweat & Tears members
Rock Bottom Remainders members
ABC Records artists
Jewish rock musicians
20th-century American pianists
American male pianists
21st-century American keyboardists
21st-century American pianists
21st-century organists
20th-century American male musicians
21st-century American male musicians
The Blues Project members
21st-century American Jews
American male songwriters
American organists